USS Pete (SP-596) was a United States Navy patrol vessel in commission from 1917 to 1918.

Pete was built as a private motorboat of the same name by Chubbuck at Kingston, Massachusetts. On 28 April 1917, the U.S. Navy chartered her from her owner, E. C. Potter, for use as a section patrol boat during World War I. She was commissioned as USS Pete (SP-596).

Assigned to the 1st Naval District in northern New England and based at Boston, Massachusetts, Pete carried out patrol duties until March 1918.

Pete was returned to Potter on 26 March 1918.

References

Department of the Navy Naval History and Heritage Command Online Library of Selected Images: U.S. Navy Ships: USS Pete (SP-596), 1917–1918
NavSource Online: Section Patrol Craft Photo Archive Pete (SP 596)

Patrol vessels of the United States Navy
World War I patrol vessels of the United States
Ships built in Boston
1917 ships